Tony Hajjar (born August 17, 1974) is a Lebanese American drummer, best known for playing in At the Drive-In and Sparta. As of 2016, he is playing in the reformed At The Drive-In, as well as the new group, Gone Is Gone. Tony also produced and drummed on the forthcoming New Language record. Both New Language and Gone Is Gone made their live debuts on April 27, 2016 to a sold out crowd at the Dragonfly in Los Angeles.

Biography
Hajjar was born in Beirut, Lebanon. His family fled Lebanon during the Civil War, moving to the United States and settling in El Paso, Texas. When Hajjar was fourteen his mother died from cancer and his father, who had been distant, left the family. His brother, only 18 years old at the time, assumed responsibility for the family and raised Tony and his sister.

Hajjar joined post-hardcore band At The Drive-In in 1996, becoming the band's fourth drummer. He remained with the band until they split up in 2001. During breaks from touring Hajjar taught chemistry. Following the demise of At The Drive-In Hajjar formed the band Sparta with fellow ATD-I members Paul Hinojos and Jim Ward. He also played on several other bands' recordings, including Jimmy Eat World's "Disintegration" on their "Stay on My Side Tonight" EP. As a drummer, his technique is particularly unusual. He plays a right-handed set up, playing right-handed, but switching to his naturally more dominant left hand during fills and rolls.

In 2006 Hajjar released a 16-minute short film entitled "Eme Nakia" (Arabic for Mother Nakia, Hajjar's mother's name) as part of a special edition of Sparta's album, Threes following Hajjar's early life story.

Discography

With At the Drive-In
 El Gran Orgo (1997)
 In/Casino/Out (1998)
 Vaya (1999)
 Relationship of Command (2000)
 This Station Is Non-Operational (2005) [compilation]
 in•ter a•li•a (2017)
 Diamanté (2017)

With Sparta
 Austere (2002)
 Wiretap Scars (2002)
 Live at La Zona Rosa 3.19.04 (2004)
 Porcelain (2004)
 Threes (2006)

With Nakia
 Nakia (2004)

With New Language
 Come Alive (2017)

With Gone Is Gone
 Gone Is Gone EP (2016)
 Echolocation LP (2017)
 If Everything Happens for a Reason... Then Nothing Really Matters at All LP (2020)

External links

References

Lebanese rock drummers
Sparta (band) members
At the Drive-In members
Musicians from Beirut
1974 births
Living people
Lebanese rock musicians
21st-century drummers